Narimanovo Airport, officially Astrakhan Boris M. Kustodiev International Airport,  (Russian: Аэропорт Нариманово)  is an international airport in Astrakhan, a city in southern Russia near the Caspian Sea.  It is operated by JSC "Aeroport Astrakhan". In 2018 the airport was renamed in honor of painter Boris Kustodiev.

Airlines and destinations

References

External links

Airports in Astrakhan Oblast
Novaport